Mustafa Babanlı (born February 21, 1968), is an Azerbaijani scientist, Rector of the Azerbaijan State Oil and Industry University.

On September 3, 2015, Mustafa Babanli was appointed Rector of the Azerbaijan State University of Oil and Industry. He is a member of the International Association of University Presidents, serving as Regional Chair for Middle East, Caucasus & Central Asia.

See also
 Azerbaijan Technical University
 Kyiv Polytechnic Institute

References

External links
 Vice Rector (in Azeri)

Living people
Azerbaijani engineers
Academic staff of Azerbaijan State Oil and Industry University
1968 births
Metallurgists